Pablo Nicolás Furtado Giménez (born 4 February 2004) is a Uruguayan professional footballer who plays as a midfielder for Boston River.

Club career
Furtado is a youth academy graduate of Boston River. He made his professional debut for the club on 16 July 2021 in a 1–0 league defeat against Progreso.

International career
Furtado is a current Uruguay youth international. He was part of under-15 team at 2019 South American U-15 Championship. On 15 August 2021, under-17 team coach Diego Demarco named Furtado in 20-man squad for 2021 U-18 L'Alcúdia International Football Tournament.

Career statistics

References

External links
 

2004 births
Living people
People from Tacuarembó
Association football midfielders
Uruguayan footballers
Uruguay youth international footballers
Uruguayan Primera División players
Boston River players